The New Zealand Academy of Fine Arts (also referred to as the Wellington Art Society) was founded in Wellington in July 1882 as The Fine Arts Association of New Zealand. Founding artists included painters William Beetham (first president of the Association) and Charles Decimus Barraud. The association changed its name to the New Zealand Academy of Fine Arts and was incorporated as a limited company in 1889. Charles Barraud was elected the Academy's president at its first AGM on 1 July 1889.

The Governor-General of New Zealand is the traditional patron of the Academy.

Galleries 
The Academy was granted a section of reclaimed land on Whitmore Street by the government, and its premises were constructed there in 1892. Architects involved in the building's design were Academy members Christian Toxward and Frederick de Jersey Clere. The building was used for the Academy's exhibitions and made available for hire as a source of revenue. It was later opened to the public as The Academy Free Art Gallery by Wellington mayor Thomas William Hislop, on 14 June 1907. Extensions to the gallery building, funded by grants from the government and the Macarthy Trust and by a loan from the National Bank, were designed by de Jersey Clere and another architect named Baun. The building ultimately proved unsatisfactory and, after protracted discussions within the Academy membership and negotiations with the government, the Academy decided to sell its land and gallery and put the proceeds towards the cost of constructing a national art gallery, in exchange for permanent accommodation in the new gallery. The Reserves and other Lands Disposal Act 1928 was passed to permit the sale and donation to go ahead, and in 1936 the Academy sold the Whitmore Street property and donated the proceeds to the new Dominion Museum and National Art Gallery of New Zealand, on the proviso that they would be accommodated in the new Dominion Museum building on Buckle Street.

When the National Museum and the National Art Gallery of New Zealand moved to Museum of New Zealand Te Papa Tongarewa the Academy was paid compensation of $1.2 million to enable it to establish itself elsewhere. The Academy has been based in the Wharf Offices building at 1 Queens Wharf since 1998. The refurbishment of the building for the Academy in 2000 won the architects Heriot + Melhuish the New Zealand Institute of Architects award 2001.

Exhibitors 
Artists who have exhibited their work at the Academy include Gottfried Lindauer, Frances Hodgkins, Charles Goldie, Rita Angus, Ralph Hotere and John Drawbridge.

Collection 
The Academy's Whitmore Street property had housed the national art collection as well as the Academy's permanent collection. During the transition to the new National Art Gallery all art belonging to the Academy was transferred into the national collection, despite some opposition.

Officers

Fellows 
The council of the Academy bestows the Governor-General's Award periodically to an artist who is a member of the New Zealand Academy of Fine Arts, and who has made a significant contribution to the arts in New Zealand over an extended period of time. A maximum of one award is made in any given year. The recipient also becomes a fellow of the New Zealand Academy of Fine Arts. The list of fellowships awarded to date is shown below.

References

External links 

 The Academy in "An Encyclopaedia of New Zealand" (1966), edited by A. H. McLintock

New Zealand art
Art museums and galleries in New Zealand
Arts organisations based in New Zealand
1882 establishments in New Zealand
Organisations based in Wellington